Vyacheslav Nikolayevich Vishnevskiy (born 16 April 1977 in Tomsk) is a former Russian football player.

References

1977 births
Living people
Russian footballers
FC Tom Tomsk players
FC Ural Yekaterinburg players
Russian Premier League players
FC Yenisey Krasnoyarsk players
FC Elista players
FC Baltika Kaliningrad players
FC Volgar Astrakhan players
FC Saturn Ramenskoye players
FC Anzhi Makhachkala players
FC Oryol players
FC Shinnik Yaroslavl players
SC Tavriya Simferopol players
Ukrainian Premier League players
Russian expatriate footballers
Expatriate footballers in Ukraine
Association football forwards
Sportspeople from Tomsk